Double Sculls is a 1985 Australian TV movie about a man who tries to rehabilitate an alcoholic friend, directed by Ian Gilmore and produced by Richard Brennen. The film stars Chris Haywood.

References

External links

1985 television films
1985 films
Australian television films
Australian adventure films
MTM Enterprises films
Films scored by Chris Neal (songwriter)
1980s English-language films